A Formula One car (also known as an F1 car) is a single-seat, open-cockpit, open-wheel formula racing car with substantial front and rear wings, and an engine positioned behind the driver, intended to be used in competition at Formula One racing events. The regulations governing the cars are unique to the championship and specify that cars must be constructed by the racing teams themselves, though the design and manufacture can be outsourced. Formula One cars are the fastest cars in the world around a race track, owing to very high cornering speeds achieved through the generation of large amounts of aerodynamic downforce. Due to the amount of braking force and the total cornering envelope of a Formula One car (by the friction component of the tyre, the mass of the machine and the downforce generated), Formula One drivers experience frequent lateral g-loadings in excess of five g and peak cornering forces of up to seven lateral g.

Chassis design
Modern-day Formula One cars are constructed from composites of carbon fibre and similar ultra-lightweight materials. The minimum weight permissible is  including the driver but not fuel. Cars are weighed with dry-weather tyres fitted. Prior to the 2014 F1 season, cars often weighed in under this limit so teams added ballast in order to add weight to the car. The advantage of using ballast is that it can be placed anywhere in the car to provide ideal weight distribution. This can help lower the car's centre of gravity to improve stability and also allows the team to fine-tune the weight distribution of the car to suit individual circuits.

Engines

The 2006 Formula One season saw the Fédération Internationale de l'Automobile (FIA) introduce a then-new engine formula, which mandated cars to be powered by 2.4 L naturally aspirated engines in the V8 engine configuration, with no more than four valves per cylinder. Further technical restrictions, such as a ban on variable intake trumpets, have also been introduced with the new 2.4 L V8 formula to prevent the teams from achieving higher RPM and horsepower too quickly. The  season limited engines to 18,000 rpm in order to improve engine reliability and cut costs.

Teams started to use exotic alloys in the late 1990s, leading to the FIA banning the use of exotic materials in engine construction, with only aluminium, titanium and iron alloys being allowed for the pistons, cylinders, connecting rods and crankshafts. The FIA has continually enforced material and design restrictions to limit power. Even with the restrictions, the V10s in the 2005 season were reputed to develop , power levels not seen since before the ban on turbo-charged engines in 1989.

The lesser funded teams (the former Minardi team spent less than 50 million, while Ferrari spent hundreds of millions of euros a year developing their car) had the option of keeping the current V10 for another season, but with a rev limiter to keep them competitive with the most powerful V8 engines. The only team to take this option was the Toro Rosso team, which was reformed and regrouped Minardi.

All cars have the engine located between the driver and the rear axle. The engines are a stressed member in most cars, meaning that the engine is part of the structural support framework, being bolted to the cockpit at the front end, and transmission and rear suspension at the back end.

In the 2004 championship, engines were required to last a full race weekend. For the 2005 championship, they were required to last two full race weekends and if a team changes an engine between the two races, they incur a penalty of 10 grid positions. In 2007, this rule was altered slightly and an engine only had to last for Saturday and Sunday running. This was to promote Friday running. In the 2008 season, engines were required to last two full race weekends; the same regulation as the 2006 season. However, for the 2009 season, drivers were allowed to use a maximum of 8 engines per head over the season, meaning that a couple of engines had to last three race weekends. This method of limiting engine costs also increases the importance of tactics, since the teams have to choose which races to have a new or an already-used engine.

As of the 2014 season, all F1 cars have been equipped with turbocharged 1.6 L V6 engines. Turbochargers had previously been banned since 1989. This change may give an improvement of up to 29% fuel efficiency. One of the many reasons that Mercedes dominated the season early, was due to the placement of the turbocharger's compressor at one side of the engine, and the turbine at the other; both were then linked by a shaft travelling through the vee of the engine. The benefit is that air is not traveling through as much pipework, in turn reducing turbo lag and increasing the efficiency of the car. In addition, it means that the air moving through the compressor is much cooler since it is farther away from the hot turbine section.

Transmission

Formula One cars use highly automated semi-automatic sequential gearboxes with paddle-shifters, with regulations stating that 8 forward gears (increased from 7 from the 2014 season onwards) and 1 reverse gear must be used, with rear-wheel-drive. The gearbox is constructed of carbon titanium, as heat dissipation is a critical issue, and is bolted onto the back of the engine. Fully-automatic gearboxes, and systems such as launch control and traction control, have been illegal since 2004 and 2008, respectively, to keep driver skill and involvement important in controlling the car, and to ensure that no teams are using these systems illegally to gain a competitive advantage, as well as to keep costs down. The driver initiates gear shifts using paddles mounted on the back of the steering wheel, and advanced electric solenoids, hydraulic actuators, and sensors perform the actual shift, as well as the electronic throttle control. Clutch control is also performed electro-hydraulically, except when launching from a standstill (i.e., stationary, neutral) into first gear, where the driver operates the clutch manually using a lever mounted on the back of the steering wheel. The last F1 car fitted with a conventional manual gearbox, the Forti FG01, raced in 1995.

Shift times for modern Formula One cars are in the region of 2 – 3 ms. In order to keep costs low in Formula One, gearboxes must last five consecutive events and since 2015, gearbox ratios will be fixed for each season (for 2014 they could be changed only once). Changing a gearbox before the allowed time will cause a penalty of five places drop on the starting grid for the first event that the new gearbox is used.

Aerodynamics

Aerodynamics has become key to success in the sport and teams spend tens of millions of dollars on research and development in the field each year.

The aerodynamic designer has two primary concerns: the creation of downforce, to help push the car's tyres onto the track and improve cornering forces; and minimising the drag that gets caused by turbulence and acts to slow the car down.

Several teams started to experiment with the now familiar wings in the late 1960s. Racecar wings operate on the same principle as aircraft wings but are configured to cause a downward force rather than an upward one. A modern Formula One car is capable of developing 6 Gs of lateral cornering force due to aerodynamic downforce. The aerodynamic downforce allowing this is typically greater than the weight of the car. That means that, theoretically, at high speeds, they could drive on the upside-down surface of a suitable structure; e.g. on the ceiling.

The use of aerodynamics to increase the cars' grip was pioneered in Formula One in the  season by Lotus, Ferrari and Brabham. At first, Lotus introduced modest front wings and a spoiler on Graham Hill's Lotus 49B at the 1968 Monaco Grand Prix, then Brabham and Ferrari went one better at the 1968 Belgian Grand Prix with full-width wings mounted on struts high above the driver.

Early experiments with movable wings and high mountings led to some spectacular accidents, and for the 1970 season, regulations were introduced to limit the size and location of wings. Having evolved over time, similar rules are still used today.

In the late 1960s, Jim Hall of Chaparral, first introduced "ground effect" downforce to auto racing. In the mid-1970s, Lotus engineers found out that the entire car could be made to act like a giant wing by the creation of an airfoil surface on its underside which would cause air moving relative to the car to push it to the road. Applying another idea of Jim Hall's from his Chaparral 2J sports racer, Gordon Murray designed the Brabham BT46B, which had a radiator fan that also extract air from the skirted area under the car, creating enormous downforce. After technical challenges from other teams, it was withdrawn after a single race. Rule changes then followed to limit the benefits of 'ground effects' – firstly a ban on the skirts used to contain the low-pressure area, later a requirement for a 'stepped floor'.

Despite the full-sized wind tunnels and vast computing power used by the aerodynamic departments of most teams, the fundamental principles of Formula One aerodynamics still apply: to create the maximum amount of downforce for the minimal amount of drag. The primary wings mounted on the front and rear are fitted with different profiles depending on the downforce requirements of a particular track. Tight, slow circuits like Monaco require very aggressive wing profiles – cars run two separate 'blades' of 'elements' on the rear wings (two is the maximum permitted). In contrast, high-speed circuits like Monza see the cars stripped of as much wing as possible, to reduce drag and increase speed on the long straights.

Every single surface of a modern Formula One car, from the shape of the suspension links to that of the driver's helmet – has its aerodynamic effects considered. Disrupted air, where the flow 'separates' from the body, creates turbulence which creates drag – which slows the car down. Almost as much effort has been spent reducing drag as increasing downforce – from the vertical end-plates fitted to wings to prevent vortices forming to the diffuser plates mounted low at the back, which helps to re-equalise pressure of the faster-flowing air that has passed under the car and would otherwise create a low-pressure 'balloon' dragging at the back. Despite this, designers can't make their cars too 'slippery', as a good supply of airflow has to be ensured to help dissipate the vast amounts of heat produced by the engine and brakes.

In recent years, most Formula One teams have tried to emulate Ferrari's 'narrow waist' design, where the rear of the car is made as narrow and low as possible. This reduces drag and maximises the amount of air available to the rear wing. The 'barge boards' fitted to the sides of cars have also helped to shape the flow of the air and minimise the amount of turbulence.

Revised regulations introduced in 2005 forced the aerodynamicists to be even more ingenious. In a bid to cut speeds, the FIA reduced downforce by raising the front wing, bringing the rear wing forward, and modifying the rear diffuser profile. The designers quickly regained much of this loss, with a variety of intricate and novel solutions such as the 'horn' winglets first seen on the McLaren MP4-20.
Most of those innovations were effectively outlawed under even more stringent aero regulations imposed by the FIA for 2009. The changes were designed to promote overtaking by making it easier for a car to closely follow another. The new rules took the cars into another new era, with lower and wider front wings, taller and narrower rear wings, and generally much 'cleaner' bodywork. Perhaps the most interesting change, however, was the introduction of 'moveable aerodynamics', with the driver able to make limited adjustments to the front wing from the cockpit during a race.

That was usurped for 2011 by the new DRS (Drag Reduction System) rear wing system. This too allows drivers to make adjustments, but the system's availability is electronically governed – originally it could be used at any time in practice and qualifying (unless a driver is on wet-weather tyres), but during the race, it could only be activated when a driver is less than one second behind another car at pre-determined points on the track. (From 2013 DRS is available only at the pre-determined points during all sessions). The system is then deactivated once the driver brakes. The system "stalls" the rear wing by opening a flap, which leaves a 50 mm horizontal gap in the wing, thus reducing drag and allowing higher top speeds. However, this also reduces downforce so it is normally used on long straight track sections or sections which do not require high downforce.

The system was introduced to promote more overtaking, and is often the reason for overtaking on straights or at the end of straights where overtaking is encouraged in the following corner(s). However, the reception of the DRS system has differed among drivers, fans, and specialists. Returning Formula 1 driver Robert Kubica has been quoted as saying he "has not seen any overtaking moves in Formula 1 for two years", suggesting that the DRS is an unnatural way to pass cars on the track as it does not actually require driver skill to successfully overtake a competitor, therefore, it would not be overtaking.

Wings

Early designs linked wings directly to the suspension, but several accidents led to rules stating that wings must be fixed rigidly to the chassis. The cars' aerodynamics are designed to provide maximum downforce with a minimum of drag; every part of the bodywork is designed with this aim in mind. Like most open-wheel cars they feature large front and rear aerofoils, but they are far more developed than American open-wheel racers, which depend more on suspension tuning; for instance, the nose is raised above the centre of the front aerofoil, allowing its entire width to provide downforce. The front and rear wings are highly sculpted and extremely fine 'tuned', along with the rest of the body such as the turning vanes beneath the nose, bargeboards, sidepods, underbody, and the rear diffuser. They also feature aerodynamic appendages that direct the airflow.

The bargeboards, in particular, are designed, shaped, configured, adjusted, and positioned not to create downforce directly, as with a conventional wing or underbody venturi, but to create vortices from the air spillage at their edges. The use of vortices is a significant feature of the latest breeds of F1 cars. Since a vortex is a rotating fluid that creates a low-pressure zone at its centre, creating vortices lowers the overall local pressure of the air. Since low pressure is what is desired under the car, as it allows normal atmospheric pressure to press the car down from the top; by creating vortices, downforce can be augmented while still staying within the rules prohibiting ground effects.

The F1 cars for the 2009 season came under much questioning due to the design of the rear diffusers of the Williams, Toyota and the Brawn GP cars raced by Jenson Button and Rubens Barrichello, dubbed double diffusers. Appeals from many of the teams were heard by the FIA, which met in Paris, before the 2009 Chinese Grand Prix, and the use of such diffusers was declared as legal. Brawn GP boss Ross Brawn claimed the double diffuser design as "an innovative approach of an existing idea". These were subsequently banned for the 2011 season. Another controversy of the 2010 and 2011 seasons was the front wing of the Red Bull cars. Several teams protested claiming the wing was breaking regulations. Footage from high-speed sections of circuits showed the Red Bull front wing bending on the outsides subsequently creating greater downforce. Tests were held on the Red Bull front wing and the FIA could find no way that the wing was breaking any regulation.

Since the start of the 2011 season, cars have been allowed to run with an adjustable rear wing, more commonly known as DRS (drag reduction system), a system to combat the problem of turbulent air when overtaking. On the straights of a track, drivers can deploy DRS, which opens the rear wing, reduces the drag of the car, allowing it to move faster. As soon as the driver touches the brake, the rear wing shuts again. In free practice and qualifying, a driver may use it whenever he wishes to, but in the race, it can only be used if the driver is 1 second, or less, behind another driver at the DRS detection zone on the race track, at which point it can be activated in the activation zone until the driver brakes.

Nose box

Nose box or more commonly the nose cones serve three main purposes:
 They are the structures on which the front wings are mounted.
 They channelise the airflow to the bottom of the car toward the diffuser.
 They act as shock absorbers in case of accidents.

Nose boxes are hollow structures made of carbon fibers. They absorb the shock at the time of crash preventing injury to the driver.

Air box

Just behind the driver's cockpit is a structure called the Air Box. The AirBox serves two purposes. It receives the high-speed moving air and supplies it to the intake manifold of the engine. This high-speed air is pressurised and hence is compressed due to the Ram Effect. This high-pressure air, when supplied to the engine, boosts its power. Also, the air supplied to it is highly turbulent since it passes above the driver's helmet. The airbox absorbs this turbulent air, preventing it from disturbing the laminar airflow along with other parts.
The second advantage of the air box is its large size, which provides a large space for advertising, in turn, providing opportunities for additional ad revenue.

Ground effect 

F1 regulations heavily limit the use of ground effect aerodynamics which are a highly efficient means of creating downforce with a small drag penalty. The underside of the vehicle, the undertray, must be flat between the axles. A 10 mm thick wooden plank or skid block runs down the middle of the car to prevent the cars from running low enough to contact the track surface; this skid block is measured before and after a race. Should the plank be less than 9 mm thick after the race, the car is disqualified. The 2022 rule change allowed for teams to utilise venturi tunnels to create much more ground effect than previous seasons allowed. This change, along with a vast simplification of the over body aerodynamics, was done wirh the intention of creating closer racing by reducing the vortices created by the complex wings.

A substantial amount of downforce is provided by using a rear diffuser which rises from the undertray at the rear axle to the actual rear of the bodywork. F1 regulations heavily limited the use of ground effect until the 2022 rule change, which are a highly efficient means of creating downforce with a small drag penalty. Until 2022, the underside of the vehicle, the undertray, had to be flat between the axles.The limited size of the wings (requiring use at high angles of attack to create sufficient downforce), and vortices created by open wheels lead to a high aerodynamic drag coefficient (about 1 according to Minardi's technical director Gabriele Tredozi; compared with the average modern car, which has a Cd value between 0.25 and 0.35), so that, despite the enormous power output of the engines, the top speed of these cars is less than that of World War II vintage Mercedes-Benz and Auto Union Silver Arrows racers. However, this drag is more than compensated for by the ability to corner at extremely high speed. The aerodynamics are adjusted for each track; with a low drag configuration for tracks where high speed is more important like Autodromo Nazionale Monza, and a high traction configuration for tracks where cornering is more important, like the Circuit de Monaco.

Regulations

With the 2009 regulations, the FIA rid F1 cars of small winglets and other parts of the car (minus the front and rear wing) used to manipulate the airflow of the car in order to decrease drag and increase downforce. Currently, the front wing is shaped specifically to push air towards all the winglets and bargeboards so that the airflow is smooth. Should these be removed, various parts of the car will cause great drag when the front wing is unable to shape the air past the body of the car. The regulations which came into effect in 2009 have reduced the width of the rear wing by 25 cm, and standardised the centre section of the front wing to prevent teams from developing the front wing. The cars underwent major changes in 2017, allowing wider front and rear wings, and wider tyres.

Throughout much of the turbo-hybrid era, drivers have noted that following closely behind other cars, particularly when attempting to overtake, has been made considerably more difficult by large amounts of turbulence or 'dirty air' from the leading car reducing the aerodynamic performance of the following car. Thus, for the 2022 season, the FIA made technical changes to the aerodynamic characteristics of the cars to reduce the amount of this 'dirty air' and allow for easier overtaking. Front wing, side pods, and rear wing have all been redesigned to redirect aerodynamic turbulence upwards, and larger tyres with 18-inch wheels were adopted in an effort to limit disruptive vortices generated by their rotation.

Steering wheel

The driver has the ability to fine-tune many elements of the race car from within the machine using the steering wheel. The wheel can be used to change gears, apply rev. limiter, adjust fuel/air mix, change brake pressure, and call the radio. Data such as engine rpm, lap times, speed, and gear are displayed on an LCD screen. The wheel hub will also incorporate gear change paddles and a row of LED shift lights. The wheel alone can cost about $50,000, and with carbon fibre construction, weighs in at 1.3 kilograms. In the 2014 season, certain teams such as Mercedes have chosen to use larger LCDs on their wheels which allow the driver to see additional information such as fuel flow and torque delivery. They are also more customizable owing to the possibility of using much different software.

Fuel

The fuel used in F1 cars is fairly similar to ordinary (premium) petrol, albeit with a far more tightly controlled mix. Formula One fuel would fall under high octane premium road fuel with octane thresholds of 95 to 102. Since the 1992 season onwards all Formula One cars must mandatorily utilize unleaded racing gasoline fuel.

F1 Blends are tuned for maximum performance in given weather conditions or different circuits. During the period when teams were limited to a specific volume of fuel during a race, exotic high-density fuel blends were used which were actually more dense than water, since the energy content of a fuel depends on its mass density.

To make sure that the teams and fuel suppliers are not violating the fuel regulations, the FIA requires Elf, Shell, Mobil, Petronas, and the other fuel teams to submit a sample of the fuel they are providing for a race. At any time, FIA inspectors can request a sample from the fueling rig to compare the "fingerprint" of what is in the car during the race with what was submitted. The teams usually abide by this rule, but in 1997, Mika Häkkinen was stripped of his third-place finish at Spa-Francorchamps in Belgium after the FIA determined that his fuel was not the correct formula, as well as in 1976, both McLaren and Penske cars were forced to the rear of the Italian Grand Prix after the octane number of the mixture was found to be too high.

Tyres

The 2009 season saw the re-introduction of slick tyres replacing the grooved tyres used from 1998 to 2008.

Unlike the fuel, the tyres bear only a superficial resemblance to a normal road tyre. This is the result of a drive to maximize the road-holding ability, leading to the use of very soft compounds (to ensure that the tyre surface conforms to the road surface as closely as possible).

Since the start of the 2007 season, F1 has had a sole tyre supplier. From 2007 to 2010, this was Bridgestone, but 2011 saw the reintroduction of Pirelli into the sport, following the departure of Bridgestone. Seven compounds of F1 tyre exist; 5 are dry weather compounds (labeled C1 through C5) while 2 are wet compounds (intermediates for damp surfaces with no standing water and full wets for surfaces with standing water). Three of the dry weather compounds (generally a harder and softer compound) are brought to each race, plus both wet weather compounds. The harder tyres are more durable but give less grip, and the softer tyres the opposite. In 2009, the slick tyres returned as a part of revisions to the rules for the 2009 season; slicks have no grooves and give up to 18% more contact with the track. In the Bridgestone years, a green band on the sidewall of the softer compound was painted to allow spectators to distinguish which tyre a driver is on. Beginning in 2019, Pirelli scrapped the tyre naming system such that the tyres will denote at each Grand Prix independently as hard, medium and soft with white, yellow and red sidewalls respectively rather than having a separate name and colour for each of the five tyres. The change was implemented so that casual fans could better understand the tyre system. Generally, the three dry compounds brought to the track are of consecutive specifications.

Brakes

Disc brakes consist of a rotor and caliper at each wheel. Carbon composite rotors (introduced by the Brabham team in 1976) are used instead of steel or cast iron because of their superior frictional, thermal, and anti-warping properties, as well as significant weight savings. These brakes are designed and manufactured to work in extreme temperatures, up to 1,000 degrees Celsius (1800 °F). The driver can control brake force distribution fore and aft to compensate for changes in track conditions or fuel load. Regulations specify this control must be mechanical, not electronic, thus it is typically operated by a lever inside the cockpit as opposed to a control on the steering wheel.

An average F1 car can decelerate from 100 to 0 km/h (62 to 0 mph) in about 15 meters (48 ft), compared with a 2009 BMW M3, which needs 31 meters (102 ft). When braking from higher speeds, aerodynamic downforce enables tremendous deceleration: 4.5 g to 5.0 g (44 to 49 m/s2), and up to 5.5 g (54 m/s2) at the high-speed circuits such as the Circuit Gilles Villeneuve (Canadian GP) and the Autodromo Nazionale Monza (Italian GP). This contrasts with 1.0 g to 1.5 g (10 to 15 m/s2) for sports cars (the Bugatti Veyron is claimed to be able to brake at 1.3 g). An F1 car can brake from 200 km/h (124 mph) to a complete stop in just 2.9 seconds, using only 65 metres (213 ft).

Currently Brembo, AP Racing, Akebono and Hitco are the Formula One brake manufacturers to date.

Performance

During a demonstration at the Silverstone circuit in Britain, an F1 McLaren-Mercedes car driven by David Coulthard gave a pair of Mercedes-Benz street cars a head start of seventy seconds, and was able to beat the cars to the finish line from a standing start, a distance of only .

As well as being fast in a straight line, F1 cars have greater cornering ability. Grand Prix cars can negotiate corners at significantly higher speeds than other racing cars because of their levels of grip and downforce. Cornering speed is so high that Formula One drivers have strength training routines just for the neck muscles.

The combination of light weight (642 kg in race trim for 2013), power ( with the 3.0 L V10,  with the 2007-regulation 2.4 L V8,  with 2016 1.6 L V6 turbo), aerodynamics, and ultra-high-performance tyres is what gives the F1 car its high performance figures. The principal consideration for F1 designers is acceleration, and not simply top speed. Three types of acceleration can be considered to assess a car's performance:
 Longitudinal acceleration (speeding up)
 Longitudinal deceleration (braking)
 Lateral acceleration (turning)

All three accelerations should be maximised. The way these three accelerations are obtained and their values are:

Acceleration
The 2016 F1 cars have a power-to-weight ratio of 1,400 hp/t (1.05 kW/kg; 1,270 hp/U.S. ton; 0.635 hp/lb). Theoretically this would allow the car to reach  in less than 1 second. However the power cannot be converted to motion at low speeds due to traction loss and the usual figure is 2.5 seconds to reach . After about  traction loss is minimal due to the combined effect of the car moving faster and the downforce, hence continuing to accelerate the car at a very high rate. The figures are (for the 2016 Mercedes W07):

0 to : 2.4 seconds
0 to : 4.2 seconds
0 to : 8.4 seconds

There are also boost systems known as kinetic energy recovery systems (KERS). These devices recover the kinetic energy created by the car's braking process. They store that energy and convert it into power that can be called upon to boost acceleration. KERS typically adds  and weighs . There are principally two types of systems: electrical and mechanical flywheel. Electrical systems use a motor-generator incorporated in the car's transmission which converts mechanical energy into electrical energy and vice versa. Once the energy has been harnessed, it is stored in a battery and released at will. Mechanical systems capture braking energy and use it to turn a small flywheel which can spin at up to 80,000 rpm. When extra power is required, the flywheel is connected to the car's rear wheels. In contrast to electrical KERS, mechanical energy does not change state and is, therefore, more efficient. There is one other option available, hydraulic KERS, where braking energy is used to accumulate hydraulic pressure which is then sent to the wheels when required.

Deceleration

The carbon brakes in combination with tyre technology and the car's aerodynamics produce truly remarkable braking forces. The deceleration force under braking is usually 4 g (39 m/s2), and can be as high as 5–6 g when braking from extreme speeds, for instance at the Gilles Villeneuve circuit or at Indianapolis. In 2007, Martin Brundle, a former Grand Prix driver, tested the Williams Toyota FW29 Formula 1 car and stated that under heavy braking he felt like his lungs were hitting the inside of his ribcage, forcing him to exhale involuntarily. Here the aerodynamic drag actually helps, and can contribute as much as 1.0 g of braking, which is the equivalent of the brakes on most road sports cars. In other words, if the throttle is let go, the F1 car will slow down under drag at the same rate as most sports cars do with braking, at least at speeds above .

There are three companies that manufacture brakes for Formula One. They are Hitco (based in the US, part of the SGL Carbon Group), Brembo in Italy, and Carbone Industrie of France. Whilst Hitco manufactures their own carbon/carbon, Brembo sources theirs from Honeywell, and Carbone Industrie purchases their carbon from Messier Bugatti.

Carbon/carbon is a short name for carbon fibre reinforced carbon. This means carbon fibres strengthening a matrix of carbon, which is added to the fibres by way of matrix deposition (CVI or CVD) or by pyrolysis of a resin binder.

The carbon/carbon brake pads are actuated by 6-piston opposed callipers provided by Akebono, AP Racing or Brembo. The callipers are aluminium alloy-bodied with titanium pistons. The regulations limit the modulus of the calliper material to 80 GPa in order to prevent teams using exotic, high specific stiffness materials, for example, beryllium. Titanium pistons save weight, and also have a low thermal conductivity, reducing the heat flow into the brake fluid.

Lateral acceleration
The aerodynamic forces of a Formula 1 car can produce as much as three times the car's weight in downforce. In fact, at a speed of just , the downforce is equal in magnitude to the weight of the car. At low speeds, the car can turn at 2.0 g. At  already the lateral force is 3.0 g, as evidenced by the esses (turns 3 and 4) at the Suzuka circuit. Higher-speed corners such as Blanchimont (Circuit de Spa-Francorchamps) and Copse (Silverstone Circuit) are taken at above 5.0 g, and 6.0 g has been recorded at Suzuka's 130-R corner. This contrasts with a maximum for high-performance road cars such as Enzo Ferrari of 1.5 g or Koenigsegg One:1 of above 1.7 g for the Circuit de Spa-Francorchamps.

Since the force that creates the lateral acceleration is largely friction, and friction is proportional to the normal force applied, the large downforce allows an F1 car to corner at very high speeds. As an example of the extreme cornering speeds, the Blanchimont and Eau Rouge corners at Spa-Francorchamps are taken flat-out at above , whereas the race-spec touring cars can only do so at 150–160 km/h (note that lateral force increases with the square of the speed).

Top speeds

Top speeds are in practice limited by the longest straight at the track and by the need to balance the car's aerodynamic configuration between high straight-line speed (low aerodynamic drag) and high cornering speed (high downforce) to achieve the fastest lap time. During the 2006 season, the top speeds of Formula 1 cars were a little over 300 km/h (185 mph) at high-downforce tracks such as Albert Park, Australia and Sepang, Malaysia. On low-downforce circuits greater top speeds were registered: at Gilles-Villeneuve (Canada) 325 km/h (203 mph), at Indianapolis (USA) 335 km/h (210 mph), and at Monza (Italy) 360 km/h (225 mph). In testing one month prior to the 2005 Italian Grand Prix, Juan Pablo Montoya of the McLaren-Mercedes F1 team recorded a record top speed of 372.6 km/h (231.5 mph), which was officially recognised by the FIA as the fastest speed ever achieved by an F1 car, even though it was not set during an officially sanctioned session during a race weekend. In the 2005 Italian GP Kimi Räikkönen of McLaren-Mercedes was recorded at 370.1 km/h (229.9 mph). This record was broken at the 2016 Mexican Grand Prix by Williams driver Valtteri Bottas, whose top speed in race conditions was 372.54 km/h (231.48 mph). However, even though this information was shown in FIA's official monitors, the FIA is yet to accept it as an official record. Bottas had previously set an even higher record top speed during qualifying for the 2016 European Grand Prix, recording a speed of 378.035 km/h (234.9 mph), albeit through the use of slipstream drafting. This top speed is yet to be confirmed by any official method as currently the only source of this information is the Williams team's Twitter post, while the FIA's official speed trap data measured Bottas's speed at 366.1 km/h in that instance.

Away from the track, the BAR Honda team used a modified BAR 007 car, which they claim complied with FIA Formula One regulation, to set an unofficial speed record of 413 km/h (257 mph) on a one way straight-line run on 6 November 2005 during a shakedown ahead of their Bonneville 400 record attempt. The car was optimised for top speed with only enough downforce to prevent it from leaving the ground. On this occasion the car did not fully meet FIA Formula One regulations, as it used a moveable aerodynamic rudder for stability control, breaching article 3.15 of the 2006 Formula One technical regulation which states that any specific part of the car influencing its aerodynamic performance must be rigidly secured.

Recent FIA performance restrictions

In an effort to reduce speeds and increase driver safety, the FIA has continuously introduced new rules for F1 constructors since the 1980s.

These rules have included the banning of such ideas as the "wing car" (ground effect) in 1983 (reintroduced in 2022); the turbocharger in 1989 (these were reintroduced for 2014); active suspension and ABS in 1994; slick tyres in 1998 (these were reintroduced for 2009); smaller front and rear wings and a reduction in engine capacity from 3.5 to 3.0 litres in 1995; reducing the width of the cars from over 2 metres to around 1.8 metres in 1998; again a reduction in engine capacity from 3.0 to 2.4 litres in 2006; launch control and traction control in 1994, and again in 2004 and 2008, alongside engine braking, after electronic driver aids were reintroduced in 2001. Yet despite these changes, constructors continued to extract performance gains by increasing power and aerodynamic efficiency. As a result, the pole position speed at many circuits in comparable weather conditions dropped between 1.5 and 3 seconds in 2004 over the prior year's times. The aerodynamic restrictions introduced in 2005 were meant to reduce downforce by about 30%, however, most teams were able to successfully reduce this to a mere 5 to 10% downforce loss. Some of these new engines were capable of achieving 20,000 rpm during 2006, though for the 2007 season engine development was frozen and the FIA limited all engines to 19,000 rpm to increase reliability and control at increasing engine speeds.

In 2008, the FIA further strengthened its cost-cutting measures by stating that gearboxes are to last for 4 Grand Prix weekends, in addition to the 2 race weekend engine rule. Furthermore, all teams were required to use a standardised ECU supplied by MES (McLaren Electronic Systems) made in conjunction with Microsoft. These ECUs have placed restrictions on the use of electronic driver aids such as traction control, launch control, and engine braking and are tagged to prevent modification. The emphasis is on reducing costs as well as placing the focus back onto driver skills as opposed to the so-called 'electronic gizmos' mainly controlling the cars.

Changes were made for the 2009 season to increase dependency on mechanical grip and create overtaking opportunities – resulting in the return to slick tyres, a wider and lower front wing with a standardized centre section, a narrower and taller rear wing, and the diffuser being moved backward and made taller yet less efficient at producing downforce. The overall aerodynamic grip was dramatically reduced with the banning of complex appendages such as winglets, bargeboards and other aero devices previously used to better direct airflow over and under the cars. The maximum engine speed was reduced to 18,000 rpm to increase reliability further and conform to engine life demand.

Due to increasing environmental pressures from lobby groups and the like, many have called into question the relevance of Formula 1 as an innovating force towards future technological advances (particularly those concerned with efficient cars). The FIA has been asked to consider how it can persuade the sport to move down a more environmentally friendly path. Therefore, in addition to the above changes outlined for the 2009 season, teams were invited to construct a KERS device, encompassing certain types of regenerative braking systems to be fitted to the cars in time for the 2009 season. The system aims to reduce the amount of kinetic energy converted to waste heat in braking, converting it instead to a useful form (such as electrical energy or energy in a flywheel) to be later fed back through the engine to create a power boost. However, unlike road car systems that automatically store and release energy, the energy is only released when the driver presses a button and is useful for up to 6.5 seconds, giving an additional  and 400 kJ. It effectively mimics the 'push to pass' button from IndyCar and A1GP series. KERS was not seen in the 2010 championship – while it was not technically banned, the FOTA collectively agreed not to use it. It however made a return for the 2011 season, with all teams except HRT, Virgin and Lotus utilizing the device.

The regulations for the 2014 season limit the maximum fuel mass flow to the engine to 100 kg/h, which reduced the maximum power output from 550 kW to about 450 kW. The rules also double the power limit of the electric motor to 120 kW for both acceleration and energy recovery, and increase the maximum amount of energy the KERS is allowed to use to 4 MJ per lap, with charging limited to 2 MJ per lap. An additional electric motor-generator unit may be connected to the turbocharger.

See also
 Pitot tube

References

External links

 Official F1 site
 F1 Technical
 Animated F1 Car Guide
Official F1 site – Technical analysis
Racecar Engineering Cars
Racecar Engineering Engines
Formula1.com

Formula One